Lady Dorothy Fanny Nevill (née Walpole; 1 April 1826 in London – 24 March 1913 in London) was an English writer, hostess, horticulturist and plant collector.

She was one of five children of Horatio Walpole, 3rd Earl of Orford and Mary Fawkener, daughter of William Augustus Fawkener, sometime envoy extraordinary at St Petersburg and close friend of Empress Catherine. She received no formal education, but was tutored by a governess in French, Greek, Italian and Latin.

In 1847, she was embroiled in a scandal when caught in a summerhouse with a notorious rake, George Smythe MP, heir to a peerage. Smythe refused to marry her, and her parents' actions and statements destroyed her reputation. In 1847 she married a cousin twenty years her senior, one Reginald Henry Nevill (d. 1878), a grandson of the 1st Earl of Abergavenny and produced six children, only four of whom survived beyond childhood. She travelled extensively and cultivated a large circle of literary and artistic friends, with a sprinkling of politicians, including James McNeill Whistler, Richard Cobden, Joseph Chamberlain and Benjamin Disraeli, whom she greatly admired.   She was however, never received by Queen Victoria.

In 1851 the Nevills acquired a large Sussex property, 'Dangstein' near Rogate. Dorothy Nevill turned the estate garden into a horticultural landmark. She employed 34 gardeners in her cultivation of orchids, nepenthes, and other tropical plants. Her exotic plants were housed in seventeen conservatories and were the subject of numerous articles in journals on horticulture. Through her plants she became friendly with both William and Joseph Hooker at Kew, and supplied Charles Darwin with rare plants for his researches. Dorothy was particularly known as an orchid grower, leading to a correspondence with Darwin that began in November 1861 when he wrote to ask for specimens to further his research towards his pamphlet on orchids. Nevill was delighted to comply, and was duly acknowledged with a presentation copy.

She kept exotic birds and mammals on the estate, farmed silkworms and maintained a museum of her collections. After her husband's death, when he left all his money to their surviving children to curtail her expenditures, she moved to  'Stillyans' near Heathfield in Sussex which she rented from one of her botanical friends Doctor Robert Hogg.

She was a noted conversationalist - "The real art of conversation is not only to say the right thing at the right place, but to leave unsaid the wrong thing at the tempting moment." - and leading society hostess, her salons attracting celebrities and politicians. She served on the first committee of the Primrose League and wrote a number of volumes of memoirs:

Reminiscences (1906)
Leaves from the Notebooks of Lady Dorothy Nevill (1907)
Under Five Reigns (1910)
My Own Times (1912).
Mannington and the Walpoles, Earls of Orford (1894) 

Lady Dorothy died at her home at 45 Charles Street on 24 March 1913, where a memorial plaque was unveiled on 8 September 1998.

Her son, Ralph Nevill, wrote Life and Letters of Lady Dorothy Nevill (1919). Her daughter, Meresia Dorothy Augusta Nevill (1849–1918), was also a dedicated worker for the Primrose League. She served for many years as treasurer of the Ladies' Grand Council and died in London on 26 October 1918.

References

External links

 

1826 births
1913 deaths
English gardeners
English memoirists
British women memoirists
Daughters of British earls
Dorothy
19th-century memoirists